The MicroAce was a 1980 Sinclair ZX80 home computer clone, designed and manufactured by CompShop and distributed in the USA by MicroAce of Santa Ana, California. 

It was also sold in Australia and was distributed by Dick Smith Electronics.

Description
Advertised as "a microcomputer for everyone at a micro price ... a complete computer for $149.00 for 1K [RAM] kit" with optional 2K RAM, it was an unlicensed clone of the Sinclair ZX80 and had an identical, yet obfuscated copy of the ROM by means of a byteswap. Some time later, between 1980 and 1981, MicroAce settled with Sinclair and licensed the ROM of the ZX81.

Reception
BYTE stated that the assembly instructions were insufficient for those inexperienced in kit assembly, and suggested that beginners learn how to solder first. It found some fit and finish issues with the completed computer, and criticized MicroAce for being unresponsive to questions. The review stated that "if you recognize the limitations of the machine and don't expect too much, then I think you can buy the MicroAce kit with confidence", albeit strongly recommending the 2K RAM option.

References

Computer-related introductions in 1980
1980 establishments in California
1981 disestablishments in California
Products and services discontinued in 1981
Sinclair ZX80 clones